Marko Jovanović (born 6 January 1982) is a Serbian former professional basketball player.

Playing career 
A center, Jovanović spent his professional career with Ergonom, Partizan, Zdravlje, Sloga, RheinEnergie Köln, Löwen Braunschweig, BG Karlsruhe, Panellinios, Slovan, Vojvodina Srbijagas, Konstantin, and Odessa. In July 2006, Jovanović joined the Detroit Pistons for the NBA Summer League. He retired as a professional player with Konstantin in 2011.

National team career 
In July 2000, Jovanović was a member of the Yugoslavia U-18 (representing FR Yugoslavia) that finished 5th at the European Championship for Juniors in Zadar, Croatia. Over eight tournament games, he averaged 10.4 points, 3.8 rebounds, and 0.4 assists per game. In July/August 2002, Jovanović was a member of the Yugoslavia U-20 that finished 7th at the European Championship for Young Men in Lithuania. Over eight tournament games, he averaged 5.5 points, 3.1 rebounds, and 0.5 assists per game.

Career achievements
 German Cup winner: 1  (with RheinEnergie Köln: 2003–04)

See also 
 List of Serbian NBA Summer League players

References

External links
 Marko Jovanovic at eurobasket.com
 Marko Jovanovic at proballers.com
 Marko Jovanovic at realgm.com
 Marko Jovanovic at euroleaguebasketball.net
 Marko Jovanovic at basketball-reference.com
 Marko Jovanovic at aba-liga.com
 Marko Jovanovic at fibaeurope.com

1982 births
Living people
ABA League players
Basketball League of Serbia players
Basketball Löwen Braunschweig players
Basketball players from Niš
BC Odesa players
BG Karlsruhe players
Centers (basketball)
Greek Basket League players
KD Slovan players
KK Ergonom players
KK Partizan players
KK Sloga players
KK Vojvodina Srbijagas players
KK Zdravlje players
OKK Konstantin players
Panellinios B.C. players
RheinStars Köln players
Serbian expatriate basketball people in Germany
Serbian expatriate basketball people in Greece
Serbian expatriate basketball people in Italy
Serbian expatriate basketball people in Slovenia
Serbian expatriate basketball people in Ukraine
Serbian men's basketball players